Steel, Peech and Tozer was a large steel maker with works situated at Ickles and Templeborough, in Rotherham, South Yorkshire, England.

History 
An area of land, almost a crescent shape through Masbrough and Ickles, on the edge of  Rotherham town centre, became well known in the late 18th / early 19th centuries through its involvement in iron and steel making and there could be found the works of many of the towns iron masters. Situated between the main turnpike road linking Rotherham and Sheffield and the River Don was built the Phoenix Works, a leading manufacturer of large iron forgings, made using water powered tilt hammers. The works made forgings for marine engines, shafts for use in paddle steamers and crank axles etc. In a change to their product base, and to reflect this a change of name, 1871 saw the founding of the Phoenix Bessemer Steel Works, making steel through the use of the Bessemer process.

Unfortunately, after just 4 years the company failed and the assets were purchased by Henry Steel. The new company became known as Steel, Peech and Hampton, taking its name from those of the directors. Mr. Hampton left in 1875 and was replaced by a Mr. Edward Tozer, the company changing its name to  Steel, Peech and Tozer, a giant in South Yorkshire steelmaking had arrived.

The steel making plant was changed in 1897 when the Bessemer converters were replaced by three open hearth furnaces and the processing plant increased with the addition of cogging mills, rail mills and specialist plant for the manufacture of steel springs and railway axles. In 1914, following the outbreak of the First World War many iron and steel companies began producing munitions. In this case the work was added to the normal production, which included many component orders for the military. 
The Ickles site was proving too small to handle the production, and with steel in such demand, the company extended their works towards the Sheffield boundary, to occupy a site between the main Sheffield to Rotherham road and the Great Central Railway line. The new Melting Shop and Rolling Mills were built over the site of the old Roman fort at Templeborough. The Templeborough Melting Shop, when opened, was the largest melting shop of its type in Europe and contained 14 open hearth furnaces where steel scrap was melted down.

At the end of the Second World War there was an increase in demand for steel products such as sheet, plate and strip due to improved living standards.  As products became relatively cheap the demand grew for such items as refrigerators, canned foods and cars. SPT had a Strip Mill, which could satisfy some of this demand.  It had been producing strip to a maximum width of  230mm since 1921, however the limitation in the maximum width and site restrictions prevented extension, enlargement or modernisation of the plant. A new mill was required which would cater for the increased demand, and to this end market research was carried out to determine the size and potential of the market.  When the technical and commercial research was concluded, it was decided to build a continuous Hot Strip Mill rolling mild, carbon and special steels up to 457mm.  This new mill filled the gap between the narrow and wide strip mills operating at that time.
So in July 1955 it was announced that Brinsworth Hot Strip Mill would be built on Sheffield Road opposite Templeborough Melting Shop at a cost of £3.6 m. In less than two years it was built and the first slabs rolled on 10 June 1957, quite an achievement.  Full capacity was expected to be 8000 tonnes per week and in 1956 there were new orders for two to three years.  These orders were mainly for the motorcar, bicycle, tube and stamping industries and nearly all of them for the home market.

When building a new plant such as Brinsworth it was necessary to ensure that there would be a good supply of raw material. The ingots produced were rolled to blooms and then slabs in the Templeborough Cogging Mill. The slabs were then delivered to Brinsworth by train on one of the six rail tracks laid. The majority of these tracks have been lifted although there is still evidence on the plant of the old railway system.

Outputs steadily increased and a second shift was added by the middle of December 1957.  By September 1959 143,258 tonnes of coils had been produced. Soon records were set and in 1973 the Hot Mill achieved its highest throughput of 425,000 in one year. This reflected the boom in industry in the early 1970s. During this period other records were set. Tommy Walker produced 1,099 tonnes on a shift on 25 January 1974, which also gave a daily record of 2,815 tonnes produced. November 1972 saw the highest production for one week at 11,486 tonnes.

Mergers
Following the end of hostilities in 1918 Steel, Peech and Tozer joined with Samuel Fox and Company of Stocksbridge and the Appleby-Frodingham Steel Company of Scunthorpe to form United Steel Companies.

During World War II, again, many iron and steel works produced munitions for the war effort, not only munitions but sections for the construction of Bailey bridges, an important assistance to the Allied troops in Italy and following the D-Day landings. Because of its size and known war effort involvement the Templeborough was a prime target for the Luftwaffe.

Nationalisation
Since the end of the Second World War many industrial companies in South Yorkshire faced problems due to the decline in the need for their products. 
The large steel producers within the United Kingdom were nationalised in 1951 under the Labour Government, but, just two years later Steel, Peech & Tozer was de-nationalised. By the 1950s Templeborough's open hearth furnaces were in need of replacement and the United Steel Companies set about the task of updating its melting facilities. Plans, under the name “Operation SPEAR” (Steel Peech Electric Arc Reorganization), brought the most modern electric arc furnaces to the company, six of these replacing the 14 open hearth furnaces. When completed Templeborough Melting Shop became the world's largest electric arc steel making plant with a capability of producing 1.8 million tons per year.

Nationalised again in 1967, the works became part of British Steel Corporation. It was yo-yo time within the industry, the works was privatized and became known as Rotherham Engineering Steels, returning to become part of British Steel again and, in due course part of a take-over by the Anglo-Dutch company Corus.

With the installation of a continuous casting machine in the early 1980s there was something of a revival in the fortunes of the works, however, this was only to last for 10 years, the giant works melting its last in 1993.

Sport
The company had its own football team, which was prominent in the pre-Second World War era.

Magna
The surrounding site is being redeveloped as a Business park.

Redevelopment 
Part of the site previously owned by Alcoa (formerly Firth Rixson), to the west of Riverside Nature Park, is now being redeveloped as a 40 MW biomass power station fuelled by waste wood.

References
 Internal works newspaper Steel News.
 Rotherham Advertiser Reports on Operation SPEAR.

Ironworks and steelworks in England
Companies based in Rotherham
Defunct companies based in Yorkshire
Steel companies of the United Kingdom